Grace Baptist School was a Baptist parochial school located in Portland, Maine, USA. Established 1976, Grace Baptist educated students in grades K-12. It closed in 2013 due to lack of funds.

External links
 

1976 establishments in Maine
2013 disestablishments in Maine
Baptist schools in the United States
Defunct Christian schools in the United States
Educational institutions established in 1976
Private elementary schools in Maine
Private high schools in Maine
Private middle schools in Maine
Religion in Portland, Maine
Defunct schools in Portland, Maine
Christian schools in Maine